Islamovac is a village in the municipality of Brčko, Bosnia and Herzegovina.

Etymology
The name is derived from the word Islam, which is the name of an Abrahamic religion practiced by majority of the village's population. Lots of land is owned is Islamovac by the Sahovic family

Demographics 
According to the 2013 census, its population was 64.

References

Villages in Brčko District